Don't Tell the Bride is an Australian reality television series premiered on Network Ten on Tuesday 21 August 2012. Presented and narrated by Kate Ritchie, this series was an adaptation of the UK series Don't Tell the Bride that screened on BBC Three.

The show's format involves an engaged couple who are given $25,000 to spend on their wedding. They must spend three weeks apart without contact as the groom organises every aspect of the event and attire including the wedding dress and hen and stag parties, surprising the bride.

Episodes
 Episode 1: Melissa and Aaron's Wedding
 Episode 2: Tarin and Jason's Wedding
 Episode 3: Stef and Jake's Wedding
 Episode 4: Anastasia and Matt's Wedding
 Episode 5: Shannon and Jay's Wedding
 Episode 6: Jessica and Adam's Wedding

References

Network 10 original programming
2010s Australian reality television series
Wedding television shows
2012 Australian television series debuts
2012 Australian television series endings
Television series by Endemol Australia